Märta is a Swedish feminine given name. The name is often a diminutive of Margareta. Individuals bearing the name Märta include:
Märta of Denmark (1277–1341), Queen consort of Sweden 
Märta Adlerz (1897–1979), Swedish diver
Märta Allertz (1628–c. 1677), royal mistress of Charles X of Sweden 
Märta Andersson (born 1925), Swedish gymnast 
Märta Berendes (1639–1717), Swedish Baroness and diarist
Märta Björnbom (1888–1973), Swedish lawyer
Märta Blomstedt (1899–1982), Finnish architect 
Märta Bucht (1882–1962), Swedish schoolteacher, suffragist and peace activist
Märta Dorff (1909–1990), Swedish actress
Märta Eketrä (1851–1894), Swedish lady-in-waiting to Sophia of Nassau
Märta Johansson (1907–1998), Swedish diver
Märta Leijonhufvud (1520–1584), Swedish noble; sister of Queen Margaret Leijonhufvud
Märtha Leth (1877-1953), Swedish pharmacist
Märta Ljungberg (1656–1741), Swedish innkeeper
Märta Norberg (born 1922), Swedish cross-country skier
Märta Helena Reenstierna (1753–1841), Swedish diarist 
Märta Strömberg (1921–2012), Swedish archaeologist
Märta Tikkanen (born 1935), Finnish writer
Märta Torén (1925–1957), Swedish actress
Märta Ulfsdotter (1319-1371), Swedish lady-in-waiting to Margaret I of Denmark

References

Feminine given names
Given names derived from gemstones
Swedish feminine given names